is a Japanese manga series written and illustrated by Keitarō Yotsuya. It was serialized on Shueisha's digital magazine Shōnen Jump+ from July 2016 to April 2021. A 5-minute original net animation (ONA) produced by Shaft was released in January 2018.

Characters

Media

Manga
Akuma no Memumemu-chan is written and illustrated by Keitarō Yotsuya. It was serialized in Shueisha's digital magazine Shōnen Jump+ from July 26, 2016, to April 20, 2021. Shueisha collected its chapters in twelve tankōbon volumes, released from November 4, 2016, to June 4, 2021.

Volume list

Original net animation
A 5-minute original net animation (ONA) adaptation produced by Shaft was released on January 23, 2018. It was directed by Seiya Numata and the character designs were done by Rina Iwamoto.

References

External links
 

2018 anime ONAs
Japanese webcomics
Sex comedy anime and manga
Shaft (company)
Shōnen manga
Shueisha manga
Webcomics in print